The Karnataka State Film Award for Fourth Best Film was one of the Karnataka State Film Awards awarded for Kannada films. It was first awarded for films of 1972–73 and last in 1976–77.

Winners

References

Karnataka State Film Awards
1972 establishments in Mysore State